Sovereign Strength was an American Christian hardcore band from Lancaster, California. The band has played with Saving Grace as well as many other bands, such as Norma Jean, Texas In July, The Chariot, Sleeping Giant, and War of Ages, on the Scream the Prayer Tour. In 2015, the band briefly reunited to play a benefit show for Daniel Colato, a friend of the band's who was killed by a drunk driving accident.

Members
Current
 Nelson Flores - bass, guitar (Mychildren Mybride)
 Jordan King - vocals
 Jesse Guttierez - guitar 
 Tony Ramirez - drums

Former
 Davey Ramos - bass
 Derek Bjurman - drums

Discography
EPs
 Life Is Easy When Your Eyes Are Closed (2008)
 Sovereign Strength (2009)

Studio album
 Reflections (2010; Mediaskare)
 The Prophecy (2011; Mediaskare)

References

Musical groups established in 2005
2005 establishments in California